Shades of Blue is an American crime drama television series created by Adi Hasak and premiered on January 7, 2016. The series is set in New York City and stars Jennifer Lopez as the main character Harlee Santos, a single-mother NYPD Detective, who is forced to work in the FBI's anti-corruption task force, while dealing with her own financial and family problems.

On March 17, 2017, the series was renewed for a third and final season.

Series overview

Episodes

Season 1 (2016)

Season 2 (2017)

Season 3 (2018)

Ratings

Season 1 (2016)

Season 2 (2017)

Season 3 (2018)

References

Lists of American crime drama television series episodes